Gregory Neale Harrison (born May 31, 1950) is an American actor. He is known for his roles as Chandler in the 1987 film North Shore, as Dr. George Alonzo "Gonzo" Gates, the young surgeon assistant of Dr. Trapper John McIntyre (played by Pernell Roberts) on the CBS series Trapper John, M.D. (1979–86), and as  ruthless business tycoon Michael Sharpe in the CBS series Falcon Crest (1989–1990). Since 2015, he has played Joe O'Toole, father of Oliver, in the Hallmark Channel expansion films of Signed, Sealed and Delivered.

Early life and career

Harrison was born in Avalon, California, in 1950, the middle child of Ed Harrison, a ship's captain and poet, and Donna Lee Nagely, an aspiring dancer; they eventually divorced. He has an older sister, Kathleen (born 1948), and a younger brother, Christopher (born 1961). He served for two years in the United States Army during the Vietnam War era as a medic.

He was the title character on the science fiction series Logan's Run (1977-78), after which he played Levi Zendt on the NBC miniseries Centennial (1978). 

He appeared on an episode of M*A*S*H before garnering fame in 1979 with the role of surgeon Dr. George "Gonzo" Gates on Trapper John, M.D., starring opposite Pernell Roberts. The medical drama was spun off from M*A*S*H. Harrison remained as Gonzo on Trapper John until the middle of the show's seventh season, when he decided to leave for other ventures. The series continued for several more episodes without Harrison, but concluded its run at the end of the 1985–86 season.

Harrison's later role as stripper John Phillips in the 1981 TV movie For Ladies Only made him a favorite with women and gay men in the 1980s. He spoofed that role in the 1986 miniseries Fresno where his character appeared shirtless at every opportunity. Fresno was also a spoof of the prime-time series Falcon Crest, where Harrison became a regular three years later in the final season (1989–90). As Falcon Crest ended production in early 1990, the series' parent studio, Lorimar Television, cast Harrison in its upcoming CBS sitcom The Family Man, from producers Thomas L. Miller and Robert L. Boyett. The series, which premiered that fall, featured Harrison as a single fireman father raising his four children with the help of his father-in-law, played by Al Molinaro. Despite a few attempts by CBS to help it build an audience, The Family Man was cancelled after one season.

He later joined the cast of NBC's Sisters for the 1994–95 season, playing Daniel Albright. In 1996, he starred opposite Eric Roberts in It's My Party, a film based on the true story of a man in the end stages of AIDS who planned a party to say goodbye to friends and family.

He starred in the WB Network's Safe Harbor and One Tree Hill and has made guest appearances on other shows such as Touched by an Angel, Judging Amy, Rizzoli & Isles,
Reunion, Joey, Law & Order: Special Victims Unit, Drop Dead Diva and Hot in Cleveland.

He played Billy Flynn in a touring production of Chicago and was the male lead in each film of the Au Pair trilogy.  He also appeared as Benjamin Stone in the Broadway revival of Stephen Sondheim's Follies and starred in the original Broadway production of Kander & Ebb's musical Steel Pier. In 2011, he had a guest-starring role as a doctor on ABC's Body of Proof. More recently, he appeared on General Hospital.

Personal life
Harrison has been married since 1980 to actress Randi Oakes. The couple have four children, three girls and a boy. He lived in Gold Beach, Oregon, for 15 years; as of 2007, he lives in Eugene, Oregon.

Harrison became addicted to cocaine during the 1980s and was able to break the addiction with the help of the Betty Ford Center.

Filmography

References

External links
 
 
 

1950 births
Male actors from California
American male film actors
American male television actors
American television directors
Living people
People from Avalon, California
Male actors from Eugene, Oregon
People from Gold Beach, Oregon
20th-century American male actors
21st-century American male actors